The year 1795 in science and technology involved some significant events.

Astronomy
 December 13 – A meteorite falls to Earth at Wold Newton, East Riding of Yorkshire, England, the first to be recognised in modern times.

Botany
 National Botanic Gardens (Ireland) opened by the Royal Dublin Society.

Mathematics
 The 18-year-old Carl Friedrich Gauss develops the basis for the method of least squares analysis.

Medicine
 The British Royal Navy makes the use of lemon juice mandatory to prevent scurvy, largely due to the influence of Gilbert Blane.

Metrology
 April 7 – The gram is decreed in France to be equal to "the absolute weight of a volume of water equal to the cube of the hundredth part of the metre, at the temperature of melting ice."

Paleontology
 Georges Cuvier identifies the fossilised bones of a huge animal found in the Netherlands in 1770 as belonging to an extinct reptile.

Technology
 November 30 – Joseph Bramah is granted a British patent for hydraulic machinery, notably the hydraulic press.

Zoology
 Johann Matthäus Bechstein publishes his treatise on songbirds Naturgeschichte der Stubenvögel ("Natural History of Cage Birds") in Gotha.
 Étienne Geoffroy Saint-Hilaire publishes "Histoire des Makis, ou singes de Madagascar", introducing his theory of the unity of organic composition.

Publications
 Leonhard Euler's Letters to a German Princess, On Different Subjects in Physics and Philosophy are first translated into English by Scottish minister Henry Hunter, targeted at women, whom Hunter felt Euler intended to educate.

Awards
 Copley Medal: Jesse Ramsden

Births
 June 30 – Joseph Bienaimé Caventou, French chemist (died 1877)
 December 8 – Peter Andreas Hansen, Danish astronomer (died 1874)
 December 21
 Francisco Javier Muñiz, Argentine physician and paleontologist (died 1871)
 John Russell, English dog breeder (died 1883)

Deaths
 March 21 – Giovanni Arduino, Italian geologist (born 1714)
 July 3 – Antonio de Ulloa, Spanish explorer (born 1716)
 June 9 – François Chopart, French surgeon (born 1743)
 June 24 – William Smellie, Scottish naturalist (born 1740)
 October 1 – Robert Bakewell, English agriculturalist and geneticist (born 1725)
 Date unknown - Marie Marguerite Bihéron, French anatomist (born 1719)

References

 
18th century in science
1790s in science